The 2013 StuSells Toronto Tankard was held from October 11 to 14 at the High Park Club in Toronto, Ontario. The men's event was held as part of the 2013–14 World Curling Tour, while the women's event was held only as part of the 2013–14 Ontario Curling Tour. The men's event was held in a triple-knockout format, while the women's event was held in a round robin format. The purse for the men's event was CAD$45,000, of which the winner, Glenn Howard, received CAD$15,000, while the purse for the women's event was CAD$15,000, of which the winner, Allison Flaxey, received CAD$5,000. In the men's final, Howard defeated Mike McEwen with a score of 6–3, while in the women's final, Flaxey defeated Mary-Anne Arsenault with a score of 6–2.

Men

Teams
The teams are listed as follows:

Knockout results

A event

B event

C event

Playoffs

Women

Teams
The teams are listed as follows:

Round-robin standings
Final round-robin standings

Playoffs

References

External links

2013 in Canadian curling
Curling in Toronto
2013 in Toronto
October 2013 sports events in Canada